Rahmon Nabiyevich Nabiyev, also spelled Rakhmon Nabiev, (5 October 1930 – 11 April 1993) was a Tajik politician who served as the First Secretary of the Communist Party of Tajikistan from 1982 to 1985 and twice as the 2nd President of Tajikistan from 23 September 1991 to 6 October 1991 and from 2 December 1991 to 7 September 1992. He was also partly responsible for the Tajik Civil War. Rising out of the regional nomenklatura, Nabiyev ascended to power in 1982 as First Secretary of the Communist Party of Tajikistan. In 1985, he was ousted in a corruption scandal.

After Tajik leaders declared independence on 9 September 1991, Nabiyev orchestrated his way back into power on 23 September, only to step down on 6 October as pressure mounted for him to leave office during the presidential campaign. Nabiyev won the elections, and on 2 December 1991, he became the first elected President of Tajikistan.

Early years
Nabiyev was born on 5 October 1931 in a Tajik family of ordinary farmers, in the Khojent District (now the Ghafurov District) of the Leninabad Oblast. Starting in high school, in 1946, at the age of 16, he began to work as an accountant on a collective farm. In the same year he entered the Leninabad Agricultural College, which he graduated in 1949 to continue his studies in Tashkent, entering the Tashkent Institute of Irrigation and Agricultural Mechanization Engineers. After graduating from this university in 1954, he began to work for two years as the chief engineer of the machine-tractor station in Isfisor.

Political activity
In 1961, Nabiyev joined the Communist Party of the Tajik SSR (the republican branch of the CPSU) and began working as a department head. From 1971-1973, he was the Minister of Agriculture of the Tajik SSR and in 1973, he became the Chairman of the Council of Ministers of the Tajik SSR, becoming de facto head of government. In 1982, Nabiyev was appointed the First Secretary of the Communist Party of Tajikistan, becoming the head of the republic. In 1985 he was dismissed from his post “for addiction to revelry and alcohol”. From 1986-1991, he was the Chairman of the Presidium of the Central Council of the Nature Conservation Society of the Tajik SSR. In 1990, he was elected a deputy of the Supreme Soviet of Tajikistan, and on 23 September 1991 he became its chairman.

Leader of Tajikistan

Foreign affairs 
On 21 December 1991, Nabiyev in Alma-Ata, together with the heads of some other former Soviet republics, signed the Alma-Ata Protocol on the establishment of the Commonwealth of Independent States. On 2 March 1992, he attended the raising of the flag of Tajikistan near the UN headquarters in New York. On 15 May of that year, he signed the Collective Security Treaty (CST) in Tashkent. Despite pressure from the political opposition, the Russian 201st Military Base at his insistence did not leave Tajikistan. He would later demand that the divisional command staff and junior staff be citizens of the republic. Nabiyev was seen as being pro-Russian and pro-Uzbek position, which saw him see support from Russia's Boris Yeltsin, Uzbekistan's Islam Karimov, and Kazakhstan's Nursultan Nazarbayev respectively.

Presidential turmoil 
Disputes concerning the election led to opposition street demonstrations, which developed into a civil war in May 1992. On 7 September 1992, Nabiyev and an entourage of his were on their way to Dushanbe airport when they were ambushed by opposition forces. At the terminal, Nabiyev was forced to resign at gunpoint. After a meeting and discussions with the armed opposition in the airport's VIP lounge, Nabiyev was released.

By December 1992 the Kulyab province's former apparatchik turned paramilitary-leader, Emomali Rahmon, was in power.

Death
He died on 11 April 1993. The cause of Rahmon Nabiev's death is not clear. Officially, he died of a heart attack, but in other versions of the story, he shot himself or was killed. His family, including his daughter Munavvara Nabiyeva, have cast doubt on the official version of his death.

Nabiyev was buried in Khujand, where a state funeral was organized. The funeral commission was headed by Prime Minister Abdumalik Abdullajanov and was attended by almost all members of the leadership and government of the republic, including the chairman Emomali Rakhmonov, as well as foreign guests and ambassadors of foreign states.

In his memory, streets, schools and some other state institutions and objects are named after him throughout Tajikistan.

Personal life
Nabiyev's widow, former First Lady Mariam Nabiyev, died in a house fire in December 2017. Rahmon and Mariam had three children: two sons, Rashid and Rustam, as well as a daughter, Munavvara. The eldest son, Rashid, died in 1997 under unclear circumstances. The youngest son Rustam lives in St. Petersburg and deals with business. Munavvar lives in Dushanbe.

Rakhmon Nabiev loved football, and was a fan of the CSKA Pamir Dushanbe. In addition to the Tajik language, he was fluent in Russian and Uzbek, and understood and spoke a little Persian and Dari.

Awards
 Order of the Red Banner of Labour
 Order of the October Revolution
 Order of Lenin

See also
Khujand clan
List of presidents of Tajikistan
First Secretary of the Communist Party of Tajikistan

References

External links

1931 births
1993 deaths
Presidents of Tajikistan
Heads of state of Tajikistan
Prime Ministers of Tajikistan
Heads of government of the Tajik Soviet Socialist Republic
Recipients of the Order of Lenin
Recipients of the Order of the Red Banner
People from Khujand
Tashkent Institute of Irrigation and Agricultural Mechanization Engineers alumni
Leaders ousted by a coup
First Secretaries of the Communist Party of Tajikistan